The Circle, sometimes called The Circle UK,  is a British reality television game show and the original version of The Circle franchise. Produced by Studio Lambert and Motion Content Group and airing on Channel 4, the show bills itself as a game based around social media, with the concept that "anyone can be anyone in The Circle". Throughout the show, contestants live in the same apartment building but are never allowed to meet. The show is narrated by Sophie Willan, whilst the first and last episode of the first series were hosted by Maya Jama and Alice Levine (later replaced by Emma Willis from the second series onwards). The show has been compared to Big Brother and Catfish in format, as well as Black Mirror episode "Nosedive" with the concept of having to rate other people.

The first series was won by 26-year-old Internet comedian Alex Hobern, who had played the game claiming to be a 25-year-old woman called Kate, using photos of his real-life girlfriend Millie. Hobern also won the "viewers champion" for an additional £25,000, claiming £75,000 in total. The second series was won by Paddy Smyth, with Tim Wilson winning the "viewers champion" vote. In June 2020, it was announced that The Circle will return with a third series, as well as a celebrity series for Stand Up to Cancer, both in 2021. In May 2021, it was announced that Channel 4 had decided not to renew The Circle for a fourth series. However, Studio Lambert are reportedly in talks with Netflix to launch the British version of the show on the streaming service.

Format
The show's contestants ("players") all move into a refurbished block of flats in Salford, though series 1 was filmed in London. Contestants do not meet face-to-face during the competition, living in individual flats and communicating through messaging devices. Messaging profiles are created as a genuine or altered representation of the player, or as somebody else. Multiple players can play as one profile, sharing an apartment: One profile can be played by multiple players, with a slight differentiation so that messages can be sent to one or the other player .

The players rate each other throughout the game. In series 1, the players rated each other from 1 to 5 stars. At the end of the rating, average scores were revealed. Players after series 1 rank the other players. Eliminations (or "blockings") occur commonly when selected players, commonly the highest rated in a rating, become "influencers". On occasion rules are amended, for example the lowest rating players could be instantly blocked, the influencers' identity has been withheld, or multiple players have been blocked. Blocked players are eliminated from the game and are given an opportunity to briefly meet one player still in the game. Normally, blocked players are replaced by a new player.

During the final, the contestants rate each other one final time, the highest rated player/s wins the series and receives a cash prize. The amount was £50,000 in series 1, £70,000 in series 2 and £100,000 in series 3.

Viewers also have been able to choose a "viewers' champion" from the finalists, who would receive £25,000 in series 1 and £30,000 in series 2. Due to COVID-19 restrictions, the third series was pre-recorded, meaning the viewers' vote could not take place.

Production

The Circle app 
Each apartment that the players live in is plastered with screens in every room in order for the players to be able to hold conversations with other players as they go about their everyday lives. Each player starts out the game by creating a profile. This includes sharing their age, relationship status, a short bio, and one photo to use as their profile picture. Every day, the players are allowed to share a status update, explaining their thoughts for the day. Sometimes, either through rewards or passing a certain milestone, the players are allowed to upload another photo to their profile. Throughout the competition the Circle app remains the only way players can communicate with each other.

During a typical episode, the Circle prompts participation in a minigame. Tim Harcourt of Studio Lambert says that "some games were really good for bonding them, some were really good for them learning about each other, some were good for testing who's a catfish, some could have been more divisive."

Most episodes also included a rating exercise. Each player would rank others in The Circle, then an average score would  determine the overall placements of each player. Depending on how high or low their average placement was, the player's ranking would determine whether they became an influencer. Typically, the two players with the top rankings would be Influencers, with  the advantage of determining the player being eliminated, or "blocked."

Apartment building 
The first season of the show was produced in London.

From the second season of The Circle, production was moved to a new apartment building in Salford, England⁣ – this also became the location of production for other versions of the show. The apartment building is always prepared with twelve furnished and ready-to-use apartments for the players to live in. The building also has an exercise room and a rooftop lounge, which are also outfitted with cameras and television screens. One room in the building, called "the testimonial room," is the room players go to after they are blocked to create their goodbye video to the remaining players. On the outside of the building is a large, lit up circle made of a roughly  diameter aluminium track with LED lights strung through and around the circle.

Opposite the apartment building was the control room, which was previously a college campus that became disused. At any time in the control room, there were between twenty and thirty producers and camera operators working, recording, and sending all the messages from The Circle.

Series overview

Awards and nominations

References
Notes

Citations

External links
 
 

2018 British television series debuts
2021 British television series endings
2010s British reality television series
2020s British reality television series
Channel 4 reality television shows
English-language television shows
Television series by All3Media
Television shows set in London
The Circle (franchise)
Television series about social media